Ana Lozano del Campo (born 22 February 1991) is a Spanish long-distance runner. She competed in the women's 5000 metres at the 2017 World Championships in Athletics.

International competitions

References

External links

1991 births
Living people
Spanish female long-distance runners
World Athletics Championships athletes for Spain
Place of birth missing (living people)
Mediterranean Games bronze medalists for Spain
Mediterranean Games medalists in athletics
Athletes (track and field) at the 2018 Mediterranean Games
Spanish female cross country runners
People from Guadalajara, Spain
Sportspeople from the Province of Guadalajara
21st-century Spanish women